Tear Da Club Up may refer to:

 "Tear da Club Up", song by Three 6 Mafia, 1995
 "Tear Da Club Up", song by LeToya Luckett from her album LeToya (2006)